Afridinae is a subfamily of the moth family Nolidae. The subfamily consists of only one genus, Afrida, that was previously part of the tribe Lithosiini in the subfamily Arctiinae.

Genus and species 
 Afrida Möschler, 1886
 Afrida charientisma Dyar, 1913 
 Afrida ciliata Hampson, 1900
 Afrida cosmiogramma Dyar, 1913
 Afrida exegens Dyar, 1922
 Afrida melicerta H. Druce, 1885
 Afrida mesomelaena Hampson, 1914
 Afrida minuta H. Druce, 1885
 Afrida tortriciformis Möschler, 1886
 Afrida ydatodes Dyar, 1913

Nolidae